The Norway Lutheran Church or Old Muskego Church  stands on the edge of the campus of Luther Seminary in Saint Paul, Minnesota.

History
Old Muskego Church was erected by Norwegian-American Lutherans near Waterford in the Wind Lake area of Racine County, Wisconsin in 1844, four years before Wisconsin became a state. It was originally built in the Muskego Settlement near Muskego, Wisconsin, by Norwegian immigrant settlers.

Even Hansen Heg (1789 - 1850), father of Civil War Hero Hans Christian Heg, donated the land on which the original church was built. Within the first year of construction, the congregation called pioneer Lutheran minister Claus Lauritz Clausen, to serve as the first minister. Clausen would be followed by Hans Gerhard, future Bishop of the Norwegian Lutheran Church in America. The congregation made use of the facility for 25 years, replacing the building with a new church in 1869.

Principally through the efforts of historian, Hjalmar Holand, the Old Muskego Church was purchased, taken apart, moved and re-assembled in Saint Paul, Minnesota in 1904.  The Minnesota Historical Society dedicated the church a State Historical Site in 1963. It is now listed on the National Register of Historic Places.

References

Other sources
Nord, Mary Ann (2003) The National Register of Historic Places in Minnesota (Minnesota Historical Society)

External links
Muskego Church at Luther Theological Seminary in St. Paul, MN
Old Muskego Repair 2010

Churches completed in 1843
19th-century Lutheran churches in the United States
Churches on the National Register of Historic Places in Minnesota
National Register of Historic Places in Saint Paul, Minnesota
Lutheran churches in Minnesota
Churches in Saint Paul, Minnesota
19th-century Lutheran churches
Norwegian-American culture in Minneapolis–Saint Paul
1843 establishments in Wisconsin Territory
Relocated buildings and structures in Minnesota
Log buildings and structures on the National Register of Historic Places in Minnesota
Wooden churches in Minnesota